Senegal competed in the 2008 Summer Olympics held in Beijing, People's Republic of China from August 8 to August 24, 2008.

Athletics 

Men
Track & road events

Field events

Canoeing

Sprint

Qualification Legend: QS = Qualify to semi-final; QF = Qualify directly to final

Fencing

Men

Women

Judo

Swimming

Men

Women

Taekwondo

Wrestling

Men's freestyle

References 

Nations at the 2008 Summer Olympics
2008
Olympics